The 2010 Nova Scotia Scotties Tournament of Hearts was held January 5–10 at the Liverpool Curling Club in Liverpool, Nova Scotia. The winning team of Nancy McConnery represented Nova Scotia at the 2010 Scotties Tournament of Hearts in Sault Ste. Marie, Ontario, where they finished round robin with a 1-10 record.

Teams

Standings

Results

Draw 1
January 6, 1:00 PM

Draw 2
January 6, 7:00 PM

Draw 3
January 7, 1:00 PM

Draw 4
January 7, 7:00 PM

Draw 5
January 8, 1:00 PM

Draw 6
January 8, 7:00 PM

Draw 7
January 9, 9:00 AM

Tiebreaker
January 9, 7:00 PM

Playoffs

Semifinal
January 10, 9:00 AM

Final
January 10, 2:00 PM

Qualification

Round 1
The first qualification round was held from December 4–6, 2009 at the Glooscap Curling Club, in Kentville. It was held in a triple knockout format, qualifying six teams to the provincial championship.

Final Standings

Round 2
The second qualification round was held from December 18–20, 2009 at the Shelburne Curling Club, in Shelburne. It was held in a double knockout format, qualifying two teams to the provincial championship.

Final Standings

References

External links
Official site

New Scotia
Nova Scotia Scotties Tournament of Hearts
Curling competitions in Nova Scotia
Tournament of Hearts
Region of Queens Municipality